Orebank is an unincorporated community and census-designated place (CDP) in Sullivan County, Tennessee, United States. It was first listed as a CDP prior to the 2020 census.

It is in the northwest part of the county, bordered to the north, west, and south by the city of Kingsport. It sits on a topographic bench between Chestnut Ridge to the south and the valley of Reedy Creek to the north. Reedy Creek is a west-flowing tributary of the South Fork of the Holston River, part of the Tennessee River watershed. Orebank Road is the main street through the community, leading west into Kingsport.

Demographics

References 

Populated places in Sullivan County, Tennessee
Census-designated places in Sullivan County, Tennessee
Census-designated places in Tennessee